The museum is near the town of Aridaia in Central Macedonia, Greece, more specifically in the recreational area of Loutra Almopias, some 35 km from the Mavrovouni junction on the Thessaloniki-Edessa national highway.

The First Panhellenic Spelaeological Survey of Northern Greece was carried out in 1990. The survey brought to light a great many important finds, which had to be housed somewhere. The community of Loutra Almopias decided to display them together with folklore material on the present site.

The exhibition consists of palaeontological finds, such as the remains of a bear that lived 110,000 years ago (from Cave I at Loutra Almopias), and Neolithic finds (stone tools, mainly axes of various sizes, a stone arrowhead, a bone needle for sewing, and potsherds) from Cave II. There is also a small collection of minerals.

In the folklore section, visitors may see exhibits relating to the local folk culture, such as a womans day dress from 1950, musical instruments, implements for spinning, weaving, knitting, and cooking utensils.

Sources
 

Natural history museums in Greece
Folk museums in Central Macedonia
Buildings and structures in Pella (regional unit)